Coppervale Ski Area is a small ski area in Lassen County, California, 18 miles from Susanville. Established in the late 1930s, the area has been owned and operated by Lassen Community College since the 1960s.

References

External links
 
 Coppervale Ski Area page at Lassen Community College
 1989 Coppervale trail map at SkiMap.org

Ski areas and resorts in California
Buildings and structures in Lassen County, California
Tourist attractions in Lassen County, California